G R Varatharajulu Higher Secondary School is a school in Mayiladumparai, Theni District in the Western Tamil Nadu state of South India. It is associated with Rajshree Sugars and Chemicals Limited Management.

This school was started around the 1970s and is well known across the Kadamalaigundu - Mayiladumparai Panchayat union. Subjects were taught in both English and Tamil Medium. G R Govindarajulu School is the section of that school that uses English as a medium for teaching. This school has a good reputation in Theni District.

High schools and secondary schools in Tamil Nadu
Theni district